Permanent Mission of the Republic of Indonesia for the Association of Southeast Asian Nations, commonly abbreviated as PTRI Jakarta, is a diplomatic mission of Indonesia to the Association of Southeast Asian Nations (ASEAN). This diplomatic mission is one of the three Indonesian permanent missions for multilateral organizations, besides the Permanent Mission to the United Nations in New York and Permanent Mission to the United Nations in Geneva.

The first Indonesian Permanent Representative to ASEAN is I Gede Ngurah Swajaya, which took office from 2010 until 2013. The incumbent permanent representative is M. I. Derry Aman since 25 October 2021. The mission office is located in Senayan, South Jakarta, with close proximity to the ASEAN Headquarters in Jalan Sisingamangaraja.

See also 

 List of Indonesian ambassadors
 List of diplomatic missions of Indonesia

References

External links 
 
 

Diplomatic missions of Indonesia
Diplomatic missions in Indonesia
Diplomatic missions in Jakarta